Daniel Webster Marshall III (born January 20, 1952) is an American politician and race car driver. He was a member of the Danville, Virginia city council 2000–2001. He has been a Republican member of the Virginia House of Delegates since 2002, representing the 14th district, made up of Danville and parts of Henry and Pittsylvania Counties.

Electoral history

Notes

External links
Politics

Racing

1952 births
Living people
Republican Party members of the Virginia House of Delegates
Virginia city council members
Politicians from Danville, Virginia
American Le Mans Series drivers
21st-century American politicians
Sportspeople from Danville, Virginia